CHW may refer to:

Health and wellness
 Community health worker, members of local communities that provide basic health and medical care
 Catholic Healthcare West, former name of a California-based corporation that operates hospitals and ancillary care facilities
 Children's Hospital of Wisconsin, a children's hospital in Milwaukee

Information technology
 Microsoft Compiled HTML Help file extension
 ChileHardware, a Spanish language computer hardware review site

Transportation
 Chestnut Hill West Line, Philadelphia; SEPTA abbreviation CHW
 Chai Wan station, Hong Kong; MTR station code CHW

Other uses
 Chicago White Sox, a Major League Baseball team (abbreviation for display of score)
 Cherry Hill High School West, a public high school in New Jersey, USA
 CHW as ISO code for WIR Bank currency